Paul Robinson Observatory is an astronomical observatory owned and operated by the New Jersey Astronomical Association. It is located at Voorhees State Park in Lebanon Township, New Jersey.

See also
 List of observatories

References

Astronomical observatories in New Jersey
Buildings and structures in Hunterdon County, New Jersey
Tourist attractions in Hunterdon County, New Jersey
Lebanon Township, New Jersey